Phiaris turfosana is a species of moth belonging to the family Tortricidae.

It is native to Europe and Northern America.

References

Olethreutini